Peter Rock (16 December 1941 – 20 June 2021) was a German football player who competed in the 1964 Summer Olympics. He was born in Rudolstadt on 16 December 1941. The Motor / CZ Jena player won 10 caps for East Germany between 1967 and 1971. For his club he played 254 matches in the East German top-flight. Rock died in Jena on 20 June 2021, at the age of 79.

References

External links
 
 
 
 

1941 births
2021 deaths
German footballers
East Germany international footballers
Olympic footballers of the United Team of Germany
Olympic bronze medalists for the United Team of Germany
Olympic medalists in football
Footballers at the 1964 Summer Olympics
Medalists at the 1964 Summer Olympics
FC Carl Zeiss Jena players
DDR-Oberliga players
German footballers needing infoboxes
Association football midfielders
People from Rudolstadt
East German footballers